Walter Meller (1819 – 10 January 1886) was a British Conservative Party politician.

Meller was elected Conservative MP for Stafford at the 1865 general election and held the seat until 1869, when the 1868 general election result was overturned due to "corrupt practices".

He was married to Elizabeth Peters, and after his death she went on to marry Markham Spofforth, Principal Agent of the Conservative Party from 1859 until 1870.

References

External links
 

UK MPs 1865–1868
UK MPs 1868–1874
1819 births
1886 deaths
Conservative Party (UK) MPs for English constituencies
Members of the Parliament of the United Kingdom for Stafford